The Eastern Suburbs Rugby Union Club Canberra, based out of Griffith, Australian Capital Territory, was founded in 1938.

Easts compete in the first division of the ACTRU competition since 2020, having been unable to field teams in the John I Dent Cup, the highest level rugby competition in the region.

History

Easts are one of A.C.T rugby's foundation clubs. They were once affiliated with the RMC Duntroon Rugby Club. RMC provided Easts with a great deal of rugby talent, which dramatically increased the capacity of Easts to turn out competitive sides on a weekly basis. In the mid-1980s, the RMC rugby fraternity split from the Easts to establish itself as an independent entity. RMC now compete in the ACT Division 1 competition.

The club survived tumultuous years in the early 2000s, which saw the clubhouse in Manuka sold. Whilst Easts played regular finals football in these years, the financial stability and ongoing future of the club was in jeopardy.

In 2008, Easts made the grand final on the back of a strong playing roster and depth in the club's ranks. Easts narrowly lost to the Queanbeyan Whites 22–15 in front of a large crowd at Viking Park.

In 2009 to 2012, the club struggled on the field. In 2012, Brumbies head coach, Jake White (Springboks RWC winning coach) undertook an initiative to bolster the local ACT competition. Five ACT Brumbies players were allocated to Easts, including: Stephen Moore (Brumbies/Wallabies – Hooker), Jerry Yanuyanutawa (Fiji, Brumbies, London-Irish – Prop), Ben Hand (Brumbies, Grenoble RFC – Lock), Michael Hooper (Australian U20's, Wallabies, Brumbies, Waratahs – Flanker) and Andrew Smith (Brumbies -Fullback/Centres).

New Brumbies contracted players were allocated to local Premier Division clubs, with David Pocock, Clyde Rathbone, Jordan Smiler, Etienne Ooshuizen, Stephan Van der Walt and Ruan Smith joining Easts. Previous players associated with Easts, Stephen Moore and Andrew Smith were also amongst this group.

2012 saw a change in presidency with Mr Arch Vanderglas taking on the role. He was re-elected to the presidency for 2013, alongside many changes to the Easts board and coaching ranks.

2013 saw Easts celebrate their 75th anniversary, coinciding with the ACT's centenary celebrations.

Participation
Easts currently participate in the ACTRU Premier Division based in Canberra. Easts have not secured a premiership title since 1947, with the club coming close in 2008, runners up to the Queanbeyan Whites.

Notable players

See also

ACTRU Premier Division

References

Rugby union teams in the Australian Capital Territory
Rugby clubs established in 1938
1938 establishments in Australia